Yandé Codou Sène (also Yande Codou Sene) was a Senegalese singer from the Serer ethnic group. She was born in 1932 at Somb in the Sine-Saloum delta and died on July 15, 2010 at Gandiaye in Sénégal. She was the official griot of president Léopold Sédar Senghor. Most of her music is in the Serer language.

Career
Yandé Codou sings in the old Serer tradition and have had a significant impact on Senegambian music as well as artists including Youssou N'Dour whom she has inspired immensely. Although she has been singing since she was a child and have had a profound effect on Senegambia's music scene, she did not record her first album (Night Sky in Sine Saloum) until she was aged 65. Her first recording debut on an album "Gainde" was in 1995 that she shared with Youssou N'Dour in which she received rave reviews. In that same year, her vocals were showcased on the full-length album Youssou N'Dour Presents Yandé Codou Sène. RootsWorld described her as someone who:
"can move mountains with her positively poetic voice."

In Safi Faye's Mossane (a 1996 film), Yandé's powerful vocals received rave reviews whose song in the film is associated with the evocation of the Serer Pangool (ancestral spirits and Serer Saints in the Serer religion).

President Senghor who is famous for adopting the African griot technique of "naming" in his poems is adopted from the Serer tradition as in his poem "Aux tirailleurs Sénégalais morts pour la France."  Yandé Codou who is proficient in this technique used a similar technique in the funeral of President Senghor.

Albums

Gainde, Yandé Codou Sène and Youssou N'Dour, 1995

Yandé Codou Sène, Night Sky in Sine Saloum, 1997

Tracks

Salmon Faye (sang in a cappella)
Gainde
Keur Maang Codou
Bofia Tigue Waguene
Salmon Faye
Gnaikha Gniore Ndianesse
Natangue
Keur Mang Codou

Filmography 
 Yandé Codou Sène, Diva Sérère, documentary film by Laurence Gavron, 2008
 Yandé Codou, la griotte de Senghor, documentary film by Angèle Diabang Brener, 2008
 Mossane, film by Safi Faye, 1996
 Karmen Gei, film, directed by Joseph Gai Ramaka, 2001
 Ousmane Sembene's film Faat Kine

Notes

External links 
 All music
 Portrait, Music. Télérama.fr
 Telerama.fr
 Portrait France24
 France24.com
 New York Times review of Mossan
 Yandé Codou Sène, R.I.P. – Voice of America News

 
Serer singers
Serer-language singers
World music musicians
1932 births
2010 deaths
People from Fatick Region